Thomas F. Zimmerman ( March 6, 1912 - January 2, 1991) was the 9th General Superintendent of the Assemblies of God. He is the longest serving general superintendent.

Early life and ministry
Zimmerman was born in Indianapolis, Indiana. Zimmerman began preaching while still in his teens and pastored a number of churches in the Midwest, he was ordained in 1935.

References

1912 births
1991 deaths
American Assemblies of God pastors
People from Springfield, Missouri
20th-century American clergy